Campo Grande International Airport , sometimes also informally referred to as Antônio João Airport, after the neighborhood where it is located, is the airport serving Campo Grande, Brazil.

During a transitional period, the airport is jointly operated by Infraero and AENA.

Some of its facilities are shared with the Campo Grande Air Force Base of the Brazilian Air Force.

History
The airport started operating in the 1930s as a military airfield. In the 1950s, the airport began to operate with commercial flights. The passenger terminal was dedicated in 1964.

Since 1975 it is operated by Infraero. The passenger terminal was enlarged from 1,500m² to 5,000m² during the 1980s and to 6,082 m in 1998.

Previously operated by Infraero, on August 18, 2022 the consortium AENA won a 30-year concession to operate the airport.

Airlines and destinations

Access
It is served by public transportation with bus lines 409 and 414.

See also

List of airports in Brazil
Campo Grande Air Force Base

References

External links

Airports in Mato Grosso do Sul
Airports established in 1953
Campo Grande